The administrative divisions of the Republic of Ghana consist of four geographic terrestrial plains and 16 regions. For local government, there are a total of 216 districts including 145 ordinary districts, 109 municipal districts, and six metropolitan districts.

Various types of councils exist below the district level including 58 town or area councils, 108 zonal councils, and 626 area councils. At a smaller level of local administration, there are over 16,000 unit committees.

Electorally, Ghana is divided into 275 constituencies.

Regions

Districts 

There are 228 Districts in Ghana which includes ordinary districts with population of less than 75,000, Municipality districts of population between 75,000 and 95,000 and Metropolitan districts with population of above 250,000.

Government of Ghana Parliamentary Constituencies of Ghana

Settlements

See also 
 Government of Ghana

References 

 
Subdivisions of Ghana